Kemer is a town in Burdur Province in the Mediterranean region of Turkey. It is the seat of Kemer District. Its population is 1,456 (2021).

References

Populated places in Burdur Province
Kemer District, Burdur
Towns in Turkey